Tommy Europe (born July 27, 1970) is a Canadian actor, stunt man, professional trainer and former professional Canadian football defensive back who played eleven seasons in the Canadian Football League. He played college football at Bishop's University.

Professional career

BC Lions (1993-1996)
Europe was selected in the second round (7th overall) of the 1993 CFL draft by the BC Lions.

As a rookie in 1993, Europe appeared in all 18 games for the Lions. In 1994, he appeared in all 18 games. The Lions won the 82nd Grey Cup in 1994. In 1995, he again appeared in all 18 games for the Lions. In 1996, his final season with the BC Lions, Europe again appeared in all 18 regular season games.

Montreal Alouettes (1997-1998)
In 1997, Europe joined the Montreal Alouettes. During his first season with the Alouettes he appeared in only nine games. In 1998 he appeared in 15 games.

Winnipeg Blue Bombers (1999-2003)
After spending two seasons with the Montreal Alouettes, neither of which were full 18 game seasons, Europe joined the Winnipeg Blue Bombers. During his first season with the Blue Bombers, he appeared in 18 games. For the 2000 season, he appeared in 17 games. In 2001, he appeared again in a full 18 game season. The 2002 season would be Europe's final full season playing professional football, appearing in all 18 games. The 2003 season would be his final season playing football. He appeared in only eight games.

After the 2003 season, at the age of 33, Europe retired due to nagging injuries. In his five seasons with the Winnipeg Blue Bombers, he recorded 483 defensive tackles, 21 interceptions and 12 fumble returns.

Post-football career
Europe is the owner of TommyEurope.tv, an online fitness community that has videos, social networking, E-Books, meal plans and fitness programs. In 2009 he released his Target Training Series of E-Books. He was voted BEST personal trainer in The Georgia Straight, Best of Vancouver readers poll for 2006, 2007, and 2009. His book The 10-Pound Shred: From Flab to Fit in 4 Weeks was published by HarperCollins Canada in 2011. He currently stars on the Slice reality show The Last 10 Pounds Bootcamp and Bulging Brides, working as a personal trainer and fitness coach who helps participants lose weight for an upcoming special event.

He is also an actor and stuntman.

Filmography

References

External links
 Tommy Europe Fitness official website
 

1970 births
Living people
BC Lions players
Bishop's Gaiters football players
Canadian football defensive backs
Montreal Alouettes players
Canadian football people from Toronto
Players of Canadian football from Ontario
Winnipeg Blue Bombers players
Canadian television hosts
Canadian stunt performers